Isaiah McGuire (born July 27, 2001) is an American football defensive end for the Missouri Tigers.

High school career
McGuire attended Union High School in Tulsa, Oklahoma. He committed to the University of Missouri to play college football.

College career
As a true freshman at Missouri in 2019, McGuire played in six games and had four tackles. In five games in 2020, he had 18 tackles and three sacks. He started all 13 games his junior year in 2021, recording 55 tackles and six sacks. McGuire returned to Missouri his senior year in 2022.

References

External links
Missouri Tigers bio

Living people
Players of American football from Oklahoma
American football defensive ends
Missouri Tigers football players
Year of birth missing (living people)